Arthur Tell Schwab (4 September 1896 – 27 February 1945) was a Swiss race walker. He won an Olympic silver medal over 50 kilometres in Berlin 1936. Two years earlier he had won a silver medal at the European Championships.

His son Erich Arthur Fritz Schwab won an Olympic bronze medal in 1948 and a silver in 1952 over 10 kilometres walk.

He was killed in an air raid bombing in Seglingen near Heilbronn, Germany, during World War II.

References

Sources
This article is based on a translation of an article from the German Wikipedia.

1896 births
1945 deaths
Swiss male racewalkers
Athletes (track and field) at the 1924 Summer Olympics
Athletes (track and field) at the 1932 Summer Olympics
Athletes (track and field) at the 1936 Summer Olympics
Olympic athletes of Switzerland
Olympic silver medalists for Switzerland
European Athletics Championships medalists
Medalists at the 1936 Summer Olympics
Olympic silver medalists in athletics (track and field)
Civilians killed in World War II
Deaths by airstrike during World War II